William Zander was a member of the Wisconsin State Assembly.

Biography
Zander was born on July 17, 1844 in Tessin, then in the German Confederation. He died on July 27, 1919.

Zander, Wisconsin is named after his brother, Helmuth.

Career
Zander was a member of the Assembly in 1879. Other positions he held include Chairman of the Board of Supervisors of Manitowoc County, Wisconsin. He was a Democrat.

References

External links

2manitowoc.com
'The Romance of Wisconsin Place Names' book

People from Mecklenburg
People from Manitowoc County, Wisconsin
Democratic Party members of the Wisconsin State Assembly
County supervisors in Wisconsin
1844 births
1919 deaths
Burials in Wisconsin
19th-century American politicians